Amir Alam Khan (born 2 October 1958) is an Indian politician. He has served as MLA from Thanabhawan seat and Morna seat in the UP state assembly.
He was a former Member of Parliament from Uttar Pradesh.

Personal life 
His son, Nawazish Alam Khan, was a Member of Legislative Assembly (MLA) from Budhana assembly in the district Muzaffarnagar from 2012 to 2017.

Khan is currently in Ajit Singh's Rashtriya Lok Dal.

References

|-

Year of birth missing (living people)
Samajwadi Party politicians
Rajya Sabha members from Uttar Pradesh
Living people
Uttar Pradesh MLAs 2012–2017
India MPs 1999–2004
Lok Sabha members from Uttar Pradesh
People from Muzaffarnagar district
Rashtriya Lok Dal politicians
Bahujan Samaj Party politicians
Samajwadi Party politicians from Uttar Pradesh